Pseudexentera spoliana, the bare-patched leafroller moth, is a species of moth in the family Tortricidae. It is found in the United States and southern Canada, east of the Rocky Mountains.

The wingspan is about 19 mm.

The larvae feed on Quercus species.

References

Moths described in 1864
Eucosmini